This is an incomplete list of the last surviving veterans of American wars. The last surviving veteran of any particular war, upon their death, marks the end of a historic era. Exactly who is the last surviving veteran is often an issue of contention, especially with records from long-ago wars. The "last man standing" was often very young at the time of enlistment and in many cases had lied about his age to gain entry into the service, which confuses matters further.

17th century

American Indian Wars (1622–1774)
 Samuel Murphy (1758–1851) — Virginia colonists. Last participant of Lord Dunmore's War
 Noah Johnson (1698–1798) — New England colonists. Last participant of Lovewell's War

18th century

French and Indian War (1754–1763)
 John Owen (1741–1843) — British Army. Enlisted in 1758. Also fought in the Revolutionary War.
Jonathan Benjamin (1738–1841) — British Army. Also fought in the Revolutionary War.

American Revolutionary War (1775–1783)

 Daniel Frederick Bakeman (1759–1869) — Continental Army. Last veteran drawing a pension awarded by Congress; granted a pension in 1867 even though he could not prove his service.
 John Gray (1764–1868) — Continental Army. Last verifiable veteran. Served at Yorktown. Six month service period was too short to qualify for pension. Granted a pension in 1867.
 James Robinson (1753–1868) — Continental Army. Last African American veteran. Served at Yorktown and Brandywine. Awarded Gold Medal of Valor.
 Lemuel Cook (1759–1866) — Continental Army. Last cavalryman. Served with the 2nd Light Dragoons.
Elijah Churchill (1755–1841) — Continental Army. Last Badge of Military Merit recipient.
William Richardson (1765–1873) — Claimed to have served in an Ohio militia and in a Continental Line.

American Indian Wars (1775–1924)
 Frederick Fraske (1872–1973) — U.S. Army. Last Army veteran.
 John Daw (1870–1965) — U.S. Army. Last Indian Scout.
 Dewey Beard (1857–1955) — Lakota Tribe. Last Native American participant of the Battle of the Little Big Horn. Also survived Wounded Knee.
 John Winchell Cullen (1838–1939) — U.S. Army. Fought in the Yakima War.
 Henry L. Riggs (1812–1911) — U.S. Army. Served in the Black Hawk War.

Shays' Rebellion (1786–1787)
 David Whitney (1767–1867) — Massachusetts State Militia.

Whiskey Rebellion (1791–1794)
 Michael Edwards (1767?–1876) — Pennsylvania State Militia.

19th century

War of 1812 (1812–1815)
 Hiram Cronk (1800–1905) — U.S. Army.
 James Hooper Jr. (1804–1898) — U.S. Navy. Served on the schooner  during the Battle of Baltimore.

Toledo War (1835–1836)
 Lewis W. Pearl (1815–1914) — Michigan State Militia. Later served in the Mexican-American War and the Civil War.

Texas Revolution (1835–1836)
 William Physick Zuber (1820–1913) — Texian Army.

Dorr Rebellion (1841–1842)
 Wanton Briggs (1821–1923) — Rhode Island State Militia. Last "Charterite".

Bear Flag Revolt (1846)
 John Grider (1826–1924) — California Republic Militia.

Mexican–American War (1846–1848)
Owen Thomas Edgar (1831–1929) — U.S. Navy.
William Fitzhugh Buckner (1828–1929) — U.S. Army. Fought at Taos.

Bleeding Kansas (1854–1861)
 Israel Adam Broadsword (1846–1952) — Free-Stater. Joined a Kansas Home Guard unit in 1859 to protect against raids. Later served in the Civil War.
 John Brown (1844–1940) — Border Ruffian. Participated in the Lawrence Massacre with Quantrill's Raiders.

American Civil War (1861–1865)
 Albert Henry Woolson (1850–1956) — Union Army. Last verified Union veteran.
 James Albert Hard (1843–1953) — Union Army. Last combat veteran. Served at First Bull Run, Antietam, and Chancellorsville.
 Pleasant Riggs Crump (1847–1951) — Confederate Army. Last verified Confederate veteran. See Last surviving Confederate veterans.
 Alden G. Howell (1841–1947) — Confederate Army. Last commissioned Confederate officer.
 Henry Doll (1847–1947) — Union Navy.  Last surviving Union sailor. Served on the USS Portsmouth and USS Brooklyn.
 James Frederick Lyon (1843–1946) — Union Army. Last commissioned Union officer.
 James Burns (1845–1944) — Union Marine Corps.   Last surviving Union Marine veteran. Enlisted 9 Sept 1862.
 Samuel B. Grant (1845–1944) — Confederate Marine Corps.  Last surviving Confederate Marine veteran. Served with the Marine Guard attached to the CSS Fredericksburg.
 William Sickles (1844–1938) — Union Army. Last Medal of Honor recipient.
 Aaron Daggett (1837–1938) - Union Army. Last surviving General of the Civil War.
 Billy Rufus Stanford (1850–1937) — Confederate Navy.  Last surviving Confederate sailor. Defended Columbus, Georgia during Sherman's March to the Sea with Company C of the Naval Battalion.
 Adelbert Ames (1835–1933) - Union Army. Last surviving General of the Regular U.S. Army.
 Oliver Otis Howard (1830–1909) - Union Army. Last surviving General to have held the permanent rank of a general in the regular U.S. Army.

Korean Expedition (1871)
 William F. Lukes (1847–1923) — U.S. Navy. Last Medal of honor recipient.

Spanish–American War (1898)
 Jones Morgan (1882–1993) — U.S. Army. Claimed to have served in the 9th Cavalry.
 Jasper Garrison (1880–1987) — U.S. Army. Last verified veteran.
 Jesse D. Langdon (1881–1975) — U.S. Army. Last member of the Rough Riders.
 John Davis (1877–1970) — U.S. Navy. Last Medal of Honor recipient.

Second Samoan Civil War (1898–99)
 Bruno Albert Forsterer (1869–1957) — U.S. Marine Corps. Last Medal of Honor recipient.

Banana Wars (1898–1934)
 Donald Leroy Truesdell (1906–1993) — U.S. Marine Corps. Served in Nicaragua. Last Medal of Honor recipient.
 Herman H. Hanneken (1893–1986) — U.S. Marine Corps. Served in Haiti. Last Medal of Honor recipient.
 George M. Lowry (1889–1981) — U.S. Navy. Last Medal of Honor recipient.
 Roswell Winans (1887–1968) — U.S. Marine Corps. Served in Dominican Republic. Last Medal of Honor recipient.

Boxer Rebellion (1899–1901)
 Nathan E. Cook (1885–1992) — U.S. Navy.
 Walter Pleate (1876–1985) — U.S. Army. Also served in the Philippine–American War.
 William Seach (1877–1978) — U.S. Navy. Last Medal of Honor recipient.

Philippine–American War (1899–1902)
 Nathan E. Cook (1885–1992) — U.S. Navy.
 Walter Pleate (1876–1985) — U.S. Army.
 John Thomas Kennedy (1885–1969) — U.S. Army. Last Medal of Honor recipient.

20th century

Border War (1910–1919)
 Samuel Goldberg (1900–2006) — U.S. Cavalry.

World War I (1914–1918)
 
 Frank Woodruff Buckles (1901–2011) — U.S. Army. Last U.S. veteran, served with the 1st Fort Riley Casual Detachment.
 Lloyd Brown (1901–2007) — U.S. Navy.
 Howard Ramsey (1898–2007) — U.S. Army.  Last combat veteran.
 Albert Wagner (1899–2007) — U.S. Marine Corps. Served in the 6th Marine Regiment.
 Moses Hardy (1894–2006) — U.S. Army. Last African-American veteran.
 Edouard Izac (1891–1990) — U.S. Navy. Last Medal of Honor recipient.
 Henry Forster (1889–1989) — Aéronautique Militaire. Last American member of the La Fayette Escadrille.

Pancho Villa Expedition (1916–1917)
 Mark Matthews (1894–2005) — U.S. Army.

Allied intervention in the Russian Civil War (1918–1925)
American and other Allied forces were involved in the Polar Bear Expedition which began during World War I and continued into the Russian Civil War

 Warren V. Hileman (1901–2005) — U.S. Army. Served in the 27th Infantry Regiment as part of the American Expeditionary Force Siberia.
 Harold Gunnes (1899–2003) — U.S. Navy. Also attached to the 339th Infantry Regiment as part of the Polar Bear Expedition.

Spanish Civil War (1936–1939)

 Delmer Berg (1915–2016) — International Brigades. Volunteered in 1938. Served in anti-aircraft in the Abraham Lincoln Brigade.

World War II (1939–1945)
  
 Hershel Woodrow "Woody" Williams (1923–2022) — U.S.  Marine Corps. Last Medal of Honor recipient.
 Bradford Freeman (1924–2022) — U.S. Army. Last surviving member of Easy Company.
 Frank S. Losonsky (1920–2020) — American Volunteer Group. Last member of the Flying Tigers. Enlisted in the USAAC in 1939. Joined the AVG in 1941.
 Richard E. Cole (1915–2019) — U.S. Army Air Forces. Last participant of the Doolittle Raid (Jimmy Doolittle's co-pilot).
 Carl Kice Brown (1917–2017) — American Volunteer Group. Last pilot of the Flying Tigers. Joined in 1941.
 Steve Pisanos (1919–2016) — RAF. Last pilot of the Eagle Squadrons. Joined in 1941.
 Joseph Langdell (1914–2015) — U.S Navy.
 Lamar Crawford Sr (1920–2011) — U.S. Marine Corps. Last Marine of USS Arizona.
 Bill Bower (1917–2011) — U.S. Army Air Forces. Last pilot of Doolittle Raid.
 Lemuel R. Custis (1915–2005) — U.S. Army Air Forces – Tuskegee Airmen. Last surviving graduating member of original aviation cadet class, Class 42-C.

Korean War (1950–1953)
 Charles G. Cleveland (1929–2021) — U.S. Air Force. Last flying ace.
Ralph Puckett (born 1926) – U.S. Army. Last Medal of Honor recipient.

See also
 Military history of the United States
 List of last surviving veterans of military insurgencies and wars
 List of last surviving veterans of military operations
 List of last surviving Canadian war veterans
 List of last surviving Brazilian war veterans
 Last European veterans by war

Notes

References

American military personnel
American people by war
Surviving
Uni
Veterans' affairs in the United States
United States Department of Defense lists
United States war veterans